Andrew Toney (born November 23, 1957) is an American former professional basketball player for the Philadelphia 76ers of the National Basketball Association (NBA) from 1980 to 1988. A two-time NBA All-Star, he won an NBA championship with the 76ers in 1983.

Professional career

Philadelphia 76ers (1980–1988) 
He was dubbed "the Boston Strangler" by Boston sportswriters during the 76ers' and Celtics' rivalry in the early 1980s because of his ability to single-handedly dominate games against the Celtics, including Game 7 of the 1982 Eastern Conference Finals when he scored 34 points in the game. He also scored 30 points in Game 2, 39 points in Game 4 and averaged 26.4 points per game in that series.

Toney was drafted by the Sixers out of Southwestern Louisiana (now the University of Louisiana at Lafayette) with the eighth pick of the 1980 NBA draft.

He was named to two All-Star teams, in 1983 and 1984, and averaged 15.9 points per game for his career.

Toney was an integral part of the 1982–83 76ers championship team averaging 20 points a game, alongside teammates Julius Erving, Moses Malone, Bobby Jones and Maurice Cheeks, but his career was cut short after seven seasons by chronic foot injuries; the team did not believe that he was hurting before it was revealed that he had stress fractures on both feet. This led to a few years of bitterness between Toney and 76ers management.

Pat Williams, vice president of basketball operations for the Orlando Magic, shared an anecdote with Tony Rizzo while being interviewed on The Really Big Show on ESPN850 WKNR in Cleveland on February 11, 2010, while promoting his latest book about the late Chuck Daly. Williams said that when he was a general manager back in the days of their great rivalry with the Lakers and Sixers (c. 1980–1983), he asked Danny Ainge, the Celtics guard, what player he worried about the most come playoff time. "Not Magic or Dr. J, it's Andrew Toney that keeps me awake at night!" said Ainge. Williams went on to say that were it not for injuries Toney would have been a Hall of Famer. Charles Barkley stated that Toney was the best player he ever played with.

NBA career statistics

Regular season

|-
| style="text-align:left;"|
| style="text-align:left;"|Philadelphia
| 75 ||  || 23.6 || .495 || .310 || .712 || 1.9 || 3.6 || .8 || .1 || 12.9
|-
| style="text-align:left;"|
| style="text-align:left;"|Philadelphia
| 77 || 1 || 24.8 || .522 || .424 || .742 || 1.7 || 3.7 || .8 || .2 || 16.5
|-
| style="text-align:left; background:#afe6ba;"|†
| style="text-align:left;"|Philadelphia
| 81 || 81 || 30.5 || .501 || .289 || .788 || 2.8 || 4.5 || 1.0 || .2 || 19.7
|-
| style="text-align:left;"|
| style="text-align:left;"|Philadelphia
| 78 || 72 || 32.8 || .527 || .316 || .839 || 2.5 || 4.8 || .9 || .3 || 20.4
|-
| style="text-align:left;"|
| style="text-align:left;"|Philadelphia
| 70 || 65 || 32.0 || .492 || .371 || .862 || 2.5 || 5.2 || .9 || .3 || 17.8
|-
| style="text-align:left;"|
| style="text-align:left;"|Philadelphia
| 6 || 0 || 14.0 || .306 || .000 || .375 || .8 || 2.0 || .3 || .0 || 4.2
|-
| style="text-align:left;"|
| style="text-align:left;"|Philadelphia
| 52 || 12 || 20.3 || .451 || .328 || .796 || 1.6 || 3.6 || .3 || .2 || 10.6
|-
| style="text-align:left;"|
| style="text-align:left;"|Philadelphia
| 29 || 15 || 18.0 || .421 || .333 || .806 || 1.6 || 3.7 || .4 || .2 || 7.3
|- class="sortbottom"
| style="text-align:center;" colspan="2"|Career
| 468 || 246 || 26.9 || .500 || .342 || .797 || 2.2 || 4.2 || .8 || .2 || 15.9
|- class="sortbottom"
| style="text-align:center;" colspan="2"|All-Star
| 2 || 0 || 20.0 || .625 || .000 || 1.000 || .5 || 5.0 || 2.0 || .0 || 10.5

Playoffs

|-
| style="text-align:left;"|1981
| style="text-align:left;”|Philadelphia
| 16 ||  || 22.3 || .428 || .111 || .815 || 2.3 || 3.4 || .7 || .4 || 13.8
|-
| style="text-align:left;"|1982
| style="text-align:left;”|Philadelphia
| 21 ||  || 33.7 || .507 || .333 || .796 || 2.4 || 4.9 || .9 || .1 || 21.8
|-
| style="text-align:left; background:#afe6ba"|1983†
| style="text-align:left;”|Philadelphia
| 12 ||  || 29.8 || .470 || .000 || .754 || 2.3 || 4.6 || .9 || .1 || 18.8
|-
| style="text-align:left;"|1984
| style="text-align:left;”|Philadelphia
| 5 ||  || 36.0 || .519 || .000 || .767 || 2.2 || 3.8 || .8 || .2 || 20.6
|-
| style="text-align:left;"|1985
| style="text-align:left;”|Philadelphia
| 13 || 13 || 34.0 || .477 || .429 || .770 || 2.5 || 5.1 || .9 || .4 || 16.8
|-
| style="text-align:left;"|1987
| style="text-align:left;”|Philadelphia
| 5 || 0 || 20.8 || .382 || .000 || 1.000 || 1.8 || 5.4 || .4 || .4 || 5.6
|- class="sortbottom"
| style="text-align:center;" colspan="2"|Career
| 72 || 13 || 29.8 || .478 || .235 || .786 || 2.3 || 4.5 || .8 || .3 || 17.4

Personal life 
Toney's son Channing played NCAA Division I basketball at the University of Alabama at Birmingham and played few matches professionally in Poland with Asseco Prokom Gdynia. He also won the second-tier Finnish Division I championship with Bisons Loimaa.

Today, he lives in Atlanta, working as an elementary school teacher.

References

External links

 Where are they now? Andrew Toney - NBA.com

1957 births
Living people
African-American basketball players
American men's basketball players
Basketball players from Birmingham, Alabama
Louisiana Ragin' Cajuns men's basketball players
National Basketball Association All-Stars
Philadelphia 76ers draft picks
Philadelphia 76ers players
Shooting guards
21st-century African-American people
20th-century African-American sportspeople